Titsingh is a Dutch surname. Notable people with the surname include:

 Abraham Titsingh (1684–1776), Dutch surgeon
 Isaac Titsingh (1745–1812), Dutch surgeon

Dutch-language surnames